Damoiseau is a lunar impact crater that is located just to the west of the Oceanus Procellarum, in the western part of the Moon's near side. It lies due east of the prominent crater Grimaldi, a walled plain with a distinctive dark floor. Due south of Damoiseau is the crater Sirsalis.

The low outer rim of Damoiseau is not quite circular, having an outward protrusion to the northeast and smaller bulges to the north and southeast. The interior floor is irregular and complex, with a series of ridges and small clefts (similar to Vitello). The crater is concentric with a larger, older crater designated Damoiseau M that is approximately twice the diameter. This outer feature is missing a rim to the northeast where it intersects the lunar mare.

To the southeast is a rille system named the Rimae Grimaldi. This continues to the west and south, for a maximum dimension of 230 kilometers.

Satellite craters
By convention these features are identified on lunar maps by placing the letter on the side of the crater midpoint that is closest to Damoiseau.

References

 
 
 
 
 
 
 
 
 
 
 
 

Impact craters on the Moon